William Charles Fitch (May 19, 1932 – February 2, 2022) was an American professional basketball coach in the National Basketball Association (NBA).  He developed multiple teams into playoff contenders and won an NBA championship with the Boston Celtics in 1981. Before entering the professional ranks, he coached college basketball at the University of Minnesota, Bowling Green State University, the University of North Dakota, and his alma mater, Coe College. Fitch's teams twice qualified for the NCAA tournament. He won the Chuck Daly Lifetime Achievement Award in 2013, and was elected to the Naismith Memorial Basketball Hall of Fame in 2019.

College coaching career
Fitch coached at four universities: the University of Minnesota, Bowling Green State University, the University of North Dakota, and his alma mater, Coe College.

He led North Dakota to three NCAA Division II men's basketball tournaments, including a Final Four appearance in 1966. At his only season with Bowling Green, the Falcons reached the 1968 NCAA University Division basketball tournament after winning the Mid-American Conference title with an 18–7 record and 10–2 in conference play. At his two seasons at Minnesota, Fitch coached the Golden Gophers to 12–12 and 13–11.

Pro coaching career
During his 25-year pro coaching career, Fitch was often hired in an attempt to improve failing teams. Although Fitch currently ranks tenth among NBA coaches in all-time number of victories (with 944), he is also ranked second in all-time losses (with 1,106) behind Lenny Wilkens. In 1996, Fitch was named one of the Top 10 Coaches in NBA History. In 2016, Fitch was honored with an honorary bench by the Hall of Fame, which surrounds a statue of James Naismith along with other granite benches in honor of great coaches, all made possible through a $150,000 donation by Rick Carlisle.

Cleveland Cavaliers
Fitch was the first head coach hired by the expansion Cleveland Cavaliers on March 19, 1970, for their inaugural 1970–71 season. In that season, the Cavaliers went 15–67. The Cavaliers did not have a season as bad as that one until the 1981–82 season, which also garnered 15 wins. The team gradually rose in wins for the next two years, winning 32 in his third season, although they slipped slightly the following year. In his first four years, they finished last each time in the Central Division.

His fifth season (1974–75) resulted in marked improvement as the Cavs won 40 games while finishing third, their first season without a last-place finish. By this point, the team had a clear leader in its #1 draft pick from 1971, Austin Carr. He had become the leading scorer for the team, but a serious knee injury curtailed Cleveland's hopes for a playoff berth.

The following season of 1975–76 was the pinnacle of his career with Cleveland. The team, now fabled as "The Miracle of Richfield", was led by team captain Carr, scoring small forward Campy Russell, shooting guard Bobby "Bingo" Smith, and a supporting cast of largely unknown players such as starting center Jim Chones, and an aging Nate Thurmond. The team won 49 games (a team record for 13 seasons) and the Central Division title. They defeated the Washington Bullets in seven games to advance to the Conference Finals, where they were defeated in six games by the Boston Celtics, with Chones being sidelined by a broken foot in practice two days before the conference finals. The Cavaliers did not win another playoff series until 1992. Fitch was awarded the NBA Coach of the Year Award at the end of the season.

Fitch led the team to two more playoff berths, although they did not win either series. After a 30–52 record for the 1978–79 season, he resigned on May 21, 1979.

Boston Celtics
On May 23, 1979, Fitch was hired by the Boston Celtics, taking over for Dave Cowens, who had coached them to a 29–53 record as a player-coach the previous season. His first season in 1979–80 was also the first for Larry Bird. A former drill instructor in the U. S. Marine Corps, the coach was lauded by Bird for his intense practices and discipline. Fitch helped lead the Celtics to 61 wins along with an Atlantic Division title. In the playoffs that year, the Celtics were defeated in the Conference Finals to the Philadelphia 76ers in five games. Fitch won his second Coach of the Year Award after the season.

In his second season, the Celtics drafted Kevin McHale and acquired Robert Parish, both through a trade with the Golden State Warriors. Fitch's team won 62 games along with a second Atlantic title. They went on to beat the Houston Rockets in six games to win the 1981 NBA Finals, Boston's first title since 1976.

Fitch led the Celtics to a third consecutive Atlantic Division title in 1981–82 while winning 63 games, although the team lost in the Conference Finals to the 76ers in seven games. The 1982–83 team dropped in wins (from 63 to 56) while finishing second in the Atlantic Division, and were defeated by the Milwaukee Bucks in four games. On May 27, 1983, he resigned from the Celtics. Fitch cited Harry T. Mangurian Jr.'s announcement that he was selling the team due to difficulties with Delaware North (the owners of the Boston Garden) as the last straw, despite Fitch having three years left on his contract.

Houston Rockets
On June 1, 1983, Fitch was hired by the Houston Rockets, taking over for Del Harris, who had managed the team to 14 wins the previous season. The 1983–84 Houston Rockets season also happened to be the first season with Ralph Sampson on the team. The team won 29 games that season. The next season was the season in which the Rockets drafted Hakeem Olajuwon, and the team responded with 48 wins and a playoff berth, although they were beaten in five games by the Utah Jazz. His third season was his best season with the team as they won the Midwest Division title along with the Western Conference title after beating the Los Angeles Lakers in five games. They met Fitch's old team, the Celtics. Boston beat the team in six games to win the Finals. Fitch's following two seasons led to playoff berths, although they did not advance past the Conference Semi-finals. Fitch was fired on June 6, 1988.

New Jersey Nets
On August 21, 1989, Fitch was hired by the New Jersey Nets, replacing Willis Reed, who had gone 26–56 the previous season. The team acquired Sam Bowie on draft day in order to try and start a rebuilding process, although the team went 17–65 for the season, the fewest wins for the Nets since joining the NBA. Fitch gradually raised the team up, acquiring Derrick Coleman, Dražen Petrović, and Terry Mills helping the team qualify for a playoff berth in the 1991–92 New Jersey Nets season. The team went to the playoffs with a losing record of 40–42, sixth-best in the 14 team Eastern Conference. They lost in the First Round to Fitch's old team, the Cavaliers in four games. On May 12, 1992, he resigned as coach of the team.

Los Angeles Clippers
On July 28, 1994, Fitch was hired by the Los Angeles Clippers, replacing Bob Weiss, who had gone 27–55 the previous year. In four seasons with the team, he could not reverse the tide of a franchise that had gone on a downward spiral since making the playoffs in consecutive seasons in 1992 and 1993. However, he led them to a playoff berth once, doing so in the 1996–97 season (the last playoff berth for the team until 2006), although they were swept in the First Round by the Jazz. They made the playoffs despite going 36–46, qualifying by just two games. The following season was a disaster, with the team finishing 17–65, the worst season since finishing with that same record in the 1994–95 season. Two days after the season ended, Fitch was fired on April 20, 1998. Fitch's most losses record in NBA history with 1,106 losses a record stood for five years until Lenny Wilkens broke his mark during the 2002–03 season while coaching for the Toronto Raptors. Wilkens' NBA coaching career finished with 1,155 losses after he announced his retirement from coaching on January 22, 2005.

Personal life and death
Fitch was born in Davenport, Iowa, on May 19, 1932. He attended Coe College, where he played basketball and baseball and graduated in 1954 with a degree in physical education.

Fitch died in Lake Conroe, Texas, on February 2, 2022, at the age of 89.

Head coaching record

NBA

|-
| style="text-align:left;"|Cleveland
| style="text-align:left;"|
|82||15||67||.183|| style="text-align:center;"|4th in Central||—||—||—||—
| style="text-align:center;"|Missed Playoffs
|-
| style="text-align:left;"|Cleveland
| style="text-align:left;"|
|82||23||59||.280|| style="text-align:center;"|4th in Central||—||—||—||—
| style="text-align:center;"|Missed Playoffs
|-
| style="text-align:left;"|Cleveland
| style="text-align:left;"|
|82||32||50||.390|| style="text-align:center;"|4th in Central||—||—||—||—
| style="text-align:center;"|Missed Playoffs
|-
| style="text-align:left;"|Cleveland
| style="text-align:left;"|
|82||29||53||.354|| style="text-align:center;"|4th in Central||—||—||—||—
| style="text-align:center;"|Missed Playoffs
|-
| style="text-align:left;"|Cleveland
| style="text-align:left;"|
|82||40||42||.488|| style="text-align:center;"|3rd in Central||—||—||—||—
| style="text-align:center;"|Missed Playoffs
|-
| style="text-align:left;"|Cleveland
| style="text-align:left;"|
|82||49||33||.598|| style="text-align:center;"|1st in Central||13||6||7||.462
| style="text-align:center;"|Lost in Conf. Finals
|-
| style="text-align:left;"|Cleveland
| style="text-align:left;"|
|82||43||39||.524|| style="text-align:center;"|4th in Central||3||1||2||.333
| style="text-align:center;"|Lost in First round
|-
| style="text-align:left;"|Cleveland
| style="text-align:left;"|
|82||43||39||.524|| style="text-align:center;"|3rd in Central||2||0||2||.000
| style="text-align:center;"|Lost in First round
|-
| style="text-align:left;"|Cleveland
| style="text-align:left;"|
|82||30||52||.366|| style="text-align:center;"|4th in Central||—||—||—||—
| style="text-align:center;"|Missed Playoffs
|-
| style="text-align:left;"|Boston
| style="text-align:left;"|
|82||61||21||.744|| style="text-align:center;"|1st in Atlantic||9||5||4||.556
| style="text-align:center;"|Lost in Conf. Finals
|-   ! style="background:#FDE910;"
| style="text-align:left;"|Boston
| style="text-align:left;"|
|82||62||20||.756|| style="text-align:center;"|1st in Atlantic||17||12||5||.706
| style="text-align:center;"|Won NBA Championship
|-
| style="text-align:left;"|Boston
| style="text-align:left;"|
|82||63||19||.768|| style="text-align:center;"|1st in Atlantic||12||7||5||.583
| style="text-align:center;"|Lost in Conf. Finals
|-
| style="text-align:left;"|Boston
| style="text-align:left;"|
|82||56||26||.683|| style="text-align:center;"|2nd in Atlantic||7||2||5||.286
| style="text-align:center;"|Lost in Conf. Semi-finals
|-
| style="text-align:left;"|Houston
| style="text-align:left;"|
|82||29||53||.354|| style="text-align:center;"|6th in Midwest||—||—||—||—
| style="text-align:center;"|Missed Playoffs
|-
| style="text-align:left;"|Houston
| style="text-align:left;"|
|82||48||34||.585|| style="text-align:center;"|2nd in Midwest||5||2||3||.400
| style="text-align:center;"|Lost in First round
|-
| style="text-align:left;"|Houston
| style="text-align:left;"|
|82||51||31||.622|| style="text-align:center;"|1st in Midwest||20||13||7||.650
| style="text-align:center;"|Lost in NBA Finals
|-
| style="text-align:left;"|Houston
| style="text-align:left;"|
|82||42||40||.512|| style="text-align:center;"|3rd in Midwest||10||5||5||.500
| style="text-align:center;"|Lost in Conf. Semi-finals
|-
| style="text-align:left;"|Houston
| style="text-align:left;"|
|82||46||36||.561|| style="text-align:center;"|4th in Midwest||4||1||3||.250
| style="text-align:center;"|Lost in First round
|-
| style="text-align:left;"|New Jersey
| style="text-align:left;"|
|82||17||65||.207|| style="text-align:center;"|6th in Atlantic||—||—||—||—
| style="text-align:center;"|Missed Playoffs
|-
| style="text-align:left;"|New Jersey
| style="text-align:left;"|
|82||26||56||.317|| style="text-align:center;"|5th in Atlantic||—||—||—||—
| style="text-align:center;"|Missed Playoffs
|-
| style="text-align:left;"|New Jersey
| style="text-align:left;"|
|82||40||42||.488|| style="text-align:center;"|3rd in Atlantic||4||1||3||.250
| style="text-align:center;"|Lost in First round
|-
| style="text-align:left;"|L.A. Clippers
| style="text-align:left;"|
|82||17||65||.207|| style="text-align:center;"|7th in Pacific||—||—||—||—
| style="text-align:center;"|Missed Playoffs
|-
| style="text-align:left;"|L.A. Clippers
| style="text-align:left;"|
|82||29||53||.354|| style="text-align:center;"|7th in Pacific||—||—||—||—
| style="text-align:center;"|Missed Playoffs
|-
| style="text-align:left;"|L.A. Clippers
| style="text-align:left;"|
|82||36||46||.439|| style="text-align:center;"|5th in Pacific||3||0||3||.000
| style="text-align:center;"|Lost in First round
|-
| style="text-align:left;"|L.A. Clippers
| style="text-align:left;"|
|82||17||65||.207|| style="text-align:center;"|7th in Pacific||—||—||—||—
| style="text-align:center;"|Missed Playoffs
|- class="sortbottom"
| style="text-align:left;"|Career
| ||2,050||944||1,106||.460|| ||109||55||54||.505

Source:

References

External links
 BasketballReference.com: Bill Fitch

1932 births
2022 deaths
American men's basketball coaches
American men's basketball players
Basketball coaches from Iowa
Basketball players from Iowa
Boston Celtics head coaches
Bowling Green Falcons men's basketball coaches
Cleveland Cavaliers head coaches
Coe Kohawks baseball players
Coe Kohawks men's basketball coaches
Coe Kohawks men's basketball players
College men's basketball head coaches in the United States
Creighton Bluejays baseball coaches
Creighton Bluejays men's basketball coaches
Houston Rockets head coaches
Los Angeles Clippers head coaches
Military personnel from Iowa
Minnesota Golden Gophers men's basketball coaches
Naismith Memorial Basketball Hall of Fame inductees
National Basketball Association championship-winning head coaches
New Jersey Nets head coaches
North Dakota Fighting Hawks men's basketball coaches
Sportspeople from Cedar Rapids, Iowa
Sportspeople from Davenport, Iowa
United States Marines